Chameleon is a late 1970s/early 1980s American rock band founded by Charlie Adams.  Chameleon made Billboard charts and was renowned for Adams’ two-axis revolving, upside-down drum set, which he played in live concerts and on MTV. The band toured extensively (sponsored by the Miller Brewing Co.) performing up to 260 shows a year.  Band members have included Adams, drums, vocals, and percussion; Yanni, keyboards and synthesizers; Dugan McNeill, lead vocals and bass guitars; Johnny Donaldson, all guitars; Mark Anthony, lead vocals and keyboards; Peter Diggins, lead vocals and main guitars; Donny Paulson, guitars, vocals.

Discography
Chameleon (1981)
Techno-color (1982)
Balance (1983)
Hologram Sky (1984)

References
Chameleon
Chameleon at Minnewiki (Minnesota music encyclopedia)
Book:  Yanni; Rensin, David (2002). Yanni in Words. Miramax Books, 84–94. 1-4013-5194-8.

External links
MySpace fan page

Rock music groups from Minnesota
Musical groups from the Twin Cities